A composite fermion is the topological bound state of an electron and an even number of quantized vortices, sometimes visually pictured as the bound state of an electron and, attached, an even number of magnetic flux quanta. Composite fermions were originally envisioned in the context of the fractional quantum Hall effect, but subsequently took on a life of their own, exhibiting many other consequences and phenomena.

Vortices are an example of topological defect, and also occur in other situations. Quantized vortices are found in type II superconductors, called Abrikosov vortices. Classical vortices are relevant to the Berezenskii–Kosterlitz–Thouless transition in two-dimensional XY model.

Description 
When electrons are confined to two dimensions, cooled to very low temperatures, and subjected to a strong magnetic field, their kinetic energy is quenched due to Landau level quantization. Their behavior under such conditions is governed by the Coulomb repulsion alone, and they produce a strongly correlated quantum liquid. Experiments have shown that electrons minimize their interaction by capturing quantized vortices to become composite fermions. The interaction between composite fermions themselves is often negligible to a good approximation, which makes them the physical quasiparticles of this quantum liquid.

The signature quality of composite fermions, which is responsible for the otherwise unexpected behavior of this system, is that they experience a much smaller magnetic field than electrons. The magnetic field seen by composite fermions is given by

The effective magnetic field is a direct manifestation of the existence of composite fermions, and also embodies a fundamental distinction between electrons and composite fermions.

Sometimes it is said that electrons "swallow"  flux quanta each to transform into composite fermions, and the composite fermions then experience the residual magnetic field   More accurately, the vortices bound to electrons produce their own geometric phases which partly cancel the Aharonov–Bohm phase due to the external magnetic field to generate a net geometric phase that can be modeled as an Aharonov–Bohm phase in an effective magnetic field 

The behavior of composite fermions is similar to that of electrons in an effective magnetic field  Electrons form Landau levels in a magnetic field, and the number of filled Landau levels is called the filling factor, given by the expression  Composite fermions form Landau-like levels in the effective magnetic field  which are called composite fermion Landau levels or  levels. One defines the filling factor for composite fermions as   This gives the following relation between the electron and composite fermion filling factors

The minus sign occurs when the effective magnetic field is antiparallel to the applied magnetic field, which happens when the geometric phase from the vortices overcompensate the Aharonov–Bohm phase.

Experimental manifestations 

The central statement of composite fermion theory is that the strongly correlated electrons at a magnetic field  (or filling factor ) turn into weakly interacting composite fermions at a magnetic field  (or composite fermion filling factor ).  This allows an effectively single-particle explanation of the otherwise complex many-body behavior, with the interaction between electrons manifesting as an effective kinetic energy of composite fermions. Here are some of the phenomena arising from composite fermions:

Fermi sea 

Here, composite fermions make a Fermi sea. This Fermi sea has been observed at half filled Landau level in a number of experiments, which also measure the Fermi wave vector.

Cyclotron orbits 

These have been observed by coupling to surface acoustic waves, resonance peaks in antidot superlattice, and magnetic focusing. The radius of the cyclotron orbits is consistent with the effective magnetic field  and is sometimes an order of magnitude or more larger than the radius of the cyclotron orbit of an electron at the externally applied magnetic field .

Cyclotron resonance 

In addition to the cyclotron orbits, cyclotron resonance of composite fermions has also been observed by photoluminescence.

Shubnikov de Haas oscillations 

These oscillations arise from the quantization of the semiclassical cyclotron orbits of composite fermions into composite fermion Landau levels. From the analysis of the Shubnikov–de Haas experiments, one can deduce the effective mass and the quantum lifetime of composite fermions.

Integer quantum Hall effect 

The integer fillings of composite fermions, correspond to the electrons fillings

Combined with

which are obtained by attaching vortices to holes in the lowest Landau level, these constitute the prominently observed sequences of fractions. Examples are

The fractional quantum Hall effect of electrons is thus explained as the integer quantum Hall effect of composite fermions.  It results in fractionally quantized Hall plateaus at

with   given by above quantized values. These sequences terminate at the composite fermion Fermi sea. Note that the fractions have odd denominators, which follows from the even vorticity of composite fermions.

Fractional quantum Hall effect 

The above sequences account for most, but not all, observed fractions. Other fractions have been observed, which arise from a weak residual interaction between composite fermions, and are thus more delicate.  A number of these are understood as fractional quantum Hall effect of composite fermions. For example, the fractional quantum Hall effect of composite fermions at  produces the fraction 4/11, which does not belong to the primary sequences.

Superconductivity 

An even denominator fraction,  has been observed.  Here the second Landau level is half full, but the state cannot be a Fermi sea of composite fermions, because the Fermi sea is gapless and does not show quantum Hall effect. This state is viewed as a "superconductor" of composite fermion, arising from a weak attractive interaction between composite fermions at this filling factor. The pairing of composite fermions opens a gap and produces a fractional quantum Hall effect.

Excitons 

The neutral excitations of various fractional quantum Hall states are excitons of composite fermions, that is, particle hole pairs of composite fermions. The energy dispersion of these excitons has been measured by light scattering and phonon scattering.

Spin 

At high magnetic fields the spin of composite fermions is frozen, but it is observable at relatively low magnetic fields. The fan diagram of the composite fermion Landau levels has been determined by transport, and shows both spin-up and spin-down composite fermion Landau levels. The fractional quantum Hall states as well as composite fermion Fermi sea are also partially spin polarized for relatively low magnetic fields.

Effective magnetic field 

The effective magnetic field of composite fermions has been confirmed by the similarity of the fractional and the integer quantum Hall effects, observation of Fermi sea at half filled Landau level, and measurements of the cyclotron radius.

Mass 

The mass of composite fermions has been determined from the measurements of: the effective cyclotron energy of composite fermions; the temperature dependence of Shubnikov–de Haas oscillations; energy of the cyclotron resonance; spin polarization of the Fermi sea; and quantum phase transitions between states with different spin polarizations. Its typical value in GaAs systems is on the order of the electron mass in vacuum. (It is unrelated to the electron band mass in GaAs, which is 0.07 of the electron mass in vacuum.)

Theoretical formulations 

Much of the experimental phenomenology can be understood from the qualitative picture of composite fermions in an effective magnetic field.  In addition, composite fermions also lead to a detailed and accurate microscopic theory of this quantum liquid. Two approaches have proved useful.

Trial wave functions 

The following trial wave functions embody the composite fermion physics:

This provides an explicit mapping between the integer and the fractional quantum Hall effects. Multiplication by  attaches  vortices to each electron to convert it into a composite fermion. The right hand side is thus interpreted as describing composite fermions at filling factor . The above mapping gives wave functions for both the ground and excited states of the fractional quantum Hall states in terms of the corresponding known wave functions for the integral quantum Hall states.

Comparisons with exact results show that these wave functions are quantitatively accurate. They can be used to compute a number of measurable quantities, such as the excitation gaps and exciton dispersions, the phase diagram of composite fermions with spin, the composite fermion mass, etc. For  they reduce to the Laughlin wavefunction at fillings .

Chern–Simons field theory 

Another formulation of the composite fermion physics is through a Chern–Simons field theory, wherein flux quanta are attached to electrons by a singular gauge transformation. At the mean field approximation the physics of free fermions in an effective field is recovered. Perturbation theory at the level of the random phase approximation captures many of the properties of composite fermions.

See also 

 Composite boson
 Integer quantum Hall effect
 Fractional quantum Hall effect

References

External links
 Nobel Lecture: "The fractional quantum Hall effect" by H. L. Stormer
 "Composite Fermions: New particles in the fractional quantum Hall effect", by H. Störmer and D. Tsui, Physics News in 1994, American Institute of Physics, 1995, p. 33.
 Composite Fermion at the Pennsylvania State University
 Composite Fermions - von Klitzing's department at the Max Planck Institute
 "Composite fermions are real" at the Physics News Update, American Institute of Physics
 "Half filled Landau level yields intriguing data and theory" in Physics Today
 "The composite fermion: A quantum particle and its quantum fluids" in Physics Today

Hall effect
Quasiparticles
Quantum phases